Começar de Novo is a Brazilian telenovela produced by TV Globo and aired between 30 August 2004 and 16 April 2005.

It stars Marcos Paulo, Natália do Vale, Eva Wilma, Werner Schünemann, Carlos Vereza, Giselle Itié, Vladimir Brichta, Carolina Ferraz, Luis Gustavo and Marília Pêra in the lead roles.

Synopsis

First phase
With the background to the oil industry, the central plot of the soap opera revolves around the love between Archangel Michael and Leticia, which begins when they are still children and becomes a strong passion in adolescence. The girl's relatives - especially his mother, Lucrécia Borges - are against the union, because they belong to a wealthy family and traditional, refusing to marry a poor Leticia, who thinks the opposite of the family, and like people for who they are and not for what he has, but his mother only thinks about money and appearances.

Totally in love, married just 17 attempts to escape and Lucrécia discovers that his daughter went away and decided to save the future of her marriage without resources, thinking she will be unhappy, hires a thug to kill Miguel, the chasing and he is shot in the head, to the despair of Leticia, the force that is carried back to his house for wrongs suffered much from the mother. Michael ends up being between life and death. The boy, then, is presumed dead, since most had no vital signs and his body is released to the morgue, but he wakes up and his friend who was the burial takes you to a distant hospital and he recovers from injury, but is out of memory. He is terrified, not knowing anything about his past and only have a few memories.

To protect him, because he knew it was an attempt on his life, Ivan Mishkin, a family friend takes him to Moscow, capital of the Soviet Union.

Meanwhile, Leticia discovers that his great love died, going into deep depression and despair. To make matters worse Miguel discovers she is pregnant. His mother finds out and is horrified. Thinking more on money that the family will accumulate and a little to save the daughter of a single mother, Leticia condemned to a marriage with Anselmo, a millionaire oil industry. Trapped, destroyed from within and without hope, for Michael is dead, she marries and says to her husband who married pregnant, into thinking that the child is his, at the behest of his mother, to his misfortune.

Time passes and do not remember your past, create a new name - Andrei Ivanovitch. Miguel becomes a successful businessman in Russia and along with your friend opens a large company.

Second phase
Thirty years later, after numerous treatments and drugs, he finally reclaims memory and decides to return to Brazil with his master and teacher Dimitri Nicolaevich to unravel the mysteries of his life, as it has not regained his memory. The only thing he remembered all these years was a girl who kissed him, but not the name he knew and lived always in search of it. He tries to rediscover this woman be his great love, which is Leticia. But she's married to Anselmo, his best friend in youth, which makes it totally devastated and confused and Leticia is thrilled to learn that the man still lives his life.

Miguel, then, to try to forget it, get involved with the young Julia. Meanwhile, his enemies Lucrécia Borges and Ademar, the corrupt mayor of the city, suspect that Miguel is the young man thought to be dead for thirty years. And they do not know that Miguel is planning revenge against them. And Miguel does not know who is the nephew of Elvis, married to a radio friendly "Natureba" stoned Janis, a hilarious lady, but the one that faces an equal powerful Lucrécia Borges.

So time passes and Leticia and Miguel join again in a revenge, despotism to fight against everything and everyone to live that love and prove to everyone that you can spend whatever time is because when true love lasts forever!

Cast

Supporting cast

External links

2004 Brazilian television series debuts
2004 telenovelas
TV Globo telenovelas
Brazilian telenovelas
2005 Brazilian television series endings
Portuguese-language telenovelas
Television series about revenge